Wilderado is an American indie folk band from Tulsa, Oklahoma, United States. The band was first signed to Iamsound Records, but is now signed to Bright Antenna Records.

Wilderado's Max Rainer and Tyler Wimpee met through mutual friends in college and started writing songs together in their fifth year after most of their friends had left. They went on a thirty concert tour with Flipturn in 2022, and expanded the tour to include bands Toledo and Michigander.

In 2016, the band released their first EP, Misty Shrub. On July 22, 2016, the band released their second EP titled Latigo which amassed over 18 million streams on Spotify. On the back of Latigo, Wilderado spent the next year touring with acts such as Band of Horses, Rainbow Kitten Surprise, Lindsey Buckingham, and Judah & The Lion.

In 2018, Wilderado released their third EP titled Favors to warm critical and fan acclaim.

In July 2019, Wilderado released the single Surefire. The song was inspired by the poem “A Gradual Canticle for Augustine” by Tabitha King. Surefire was named one of the "5 Songs You Need to Hear Right Now" by Sirius XM's Spectrum.

In 2020, the band released 3 singles, CFS, Revenant, and Take Some Time, remixed by RJD2, Emancipator, Kyle McEvoy, & by Gus of Alt-J.

In 2021, the band released their newest single, "Head Right."

In October, 2021, the band released their debut album self-titled Wilderado.

In March, 2022, the band appeared on Jimmy Kimmel Live, for their television debut.

On September 24, 2022, the band performed on CBS Saturday Morning, 'Saturday Sessions' for their AM TV Debut where they performed "Surefire," "Take Some Time," and "Outside My Head."

Band name
The current name is an altered version of the name of a town in Texas called Wildorado, which the band came across while driving late at night.

Discography
Misty Shrub EP (2016)
Latigo EP (2016)
Favors EP (2018)
Favors EP (acoustic) (2018)
"Surefire" (single) (2019) - No. 11 Alternative Airplay
"CFS" (single) (2020)
"Revenant" (single) (2020)
"Take Some Time" (single) (2020)
"Head Right" (single) (2021)
"Mr. Major" (single) (2021)
"Wilderado" (album) (2021)

References

Musical groups established in 2016
Musical groups from Los Angeles
Ignition Records artists
2016 establishments in Oklahoma
Bright Antenna Records artists